Kijichon, literally camptown, refers to the towns surrounding military bases of the United States Forces Korea (USFK). They are generally located in more rural areas, many of which are near the Korean demilitarized zone. The inhabitants do not interact with Korean society at large due to the stigma associated with living and working in kijichon. In terms of Korean citizens, kijichon are primarily populated by the poor and otherwise marginalized. The towns exist mainly to provide prostitution to American soldiers, which was deemed as "necessary for soldiers to continue protecting South Korea, and was beneficial for economic development" in kijichon. All of the businesses in these towns that explicitly cater to "U.S. military personnel must be licensed by the Korea Special Tourist Association." This cooperation with the government and the fact that many bases are located near the demilitarized zone makes it easier to conceal the sex work and G.I. crime from the general population.

Women who work in kijichon are particularly stigmatized as there is a sentiment that they chose to lead that life. As such, kijichon women rarely leave and when they do, they hide their lives from their families. Poor women (some of whom were also former comfort women) were actively recruited to work in kijichon, as they were considered expendable and could be used to "protect the purity of 'respectable' Korean women."

As Korea was considered "too dangerous a locale" for American women and children and interracial marriage was illegal, the U.S. felt it necessary to manage interracial sexual liaisons. One way this was done was by maintaining the American color line—kijichon women who worked with black GIs could not work with white ones.

References 

Populated places in South Korea
Prostitution in South Korea
United States military in South Korea